Kaišiadorys District Municipality is one of 60 municipalities in Lithuania.

Elderships 
Kaišiadorys District Municipality is divided into 11 elderships:

References

External links
 Žasliai Web Page Žasliai is in Kaišiadorys District

 
Municipalities of Lithuania